Havrevold is a Norwegian surname. Notable people with the surname include:

 Finn Havrevold (1905–1988), Norwegian novelist
 Gøril Havrevold
 Odd Havrevold (1900–1991), Norwegian physician and psychiatrist
 Olafr Havrevold (1895–1972), Norwegian engineer and actor

Norwegian-language surnames